The Fuzhou Mosque is a mosque in Gulou District, Fuzhou City, Fujian Province, China. It is located under the Ankang Bridge in Fuzhou and was rebuilt in the Ming Dynasty following a fire.

Transportation
The mosque is accessible within walking distance north of Nanmendou Station of Fuzhou Metro.

See also
 Islam in China
 List of mosques in China

References

External links

 Muslims and mosques in Fujian

Buildings and structures in Fuzhou
Mosques in China